The La Mouette Samson is a French electric-powered ultralight trike, designed by Gérard Thevenot and produced by La Mouette of Fontaine-lès-Dijon. The aircraft is supplied as a complete ready-to-fly-aircraft.

Design and development
The aircraft was designed to comply with the Fédération Aéronautique Internationale microlight category as a single- or two-seater, and also to comply with the US FAR 103 Ultralight Vehicles rules when flown as a single-seater. It features a cable-braced hang glider-style high-wing, weight-shift controls, a two-seats-in-tandem open cockpit, tricycle landing gear and a single electric motor in pusher configuration.

The aircraft is made from bolted-together aluminum tubing, with its single surface wing covered in Dacron sailcloth. Its wing is supported by a single tube-type kingpost and uses an "A" frame weight-shift control bar. Due to its simple design the Samson can be folded up and stowed in the trunk of an automobile, with the wing carried on the roof rack.

The aircraft can be fitted with up to three batteries that give an endurance of 40 minutes at full power, or 80 minutes at normal cruise. The standard wing supplied is a  La Mouette design.

Specifications (Samson)

References

External links

Samson
2010s French sport aircraft
2010s French ultralight aircraft
Single-engined pusher aircraft
Electric aircraft
Ultralight trikes
High-wing aircraft